In mathematics, a GCD domain is an integral domain R with the property that any two elements have a greatest common divisor (GCD); i.e., there is a unique minimal principal ideal containing the ideal generated by two given elements. Equivalently, any two elements of R have a least common multiple (LCM).

A GCD domain generalizes a unique factorization domain (UFD) to a non-Noetherian setting in the following sense: an integral domain is a UFD if and only if it is a GCD domain satisfying the ascending chain condition on principal ideals (and in particular if it is Noetherian).

GCD domains appear in the following chain of class inclusions:

Properties 
Every irreducible element of a GCD domain is prime. A GCD domain is integrally closed, and every nonzero element is primal. In other words, every GCD domain is a Schreier domain.

For every pair of elements x, y of a GCD domain R, a GCD d of x and y and an LCM m of x and y can be chosen such that , or stated differently, if  x and y are nonzero elements and d is any GCD d of x and y, then xy/d is an LCM of x and y, and vice versa. It follows that the operations of GCD and LCM make the quotient R/~ into a distributive lattice, where "~" denotes the equivalence relation of being associate elements. The equivalence between the existence of GCDs and the existence of LCMs is not a corollary of the similar result on complete lattices, as the quotient R/~ need not be a complete lattice for a GCD domain R.

If R is a GCD domain, then the polynomial ring R[X1,...,Xn] is also a GCD domain.

R is a GCD domain if and only if finite intersections of its principal ideals are principal.

For a polynomial in X over a GCD domain, one can define its content as the GCD of all its coefficients. Then the content of a product of polynomials is the product of their contents, as expressed by Gauss's lemma, which is valid over GCD domains.

Examples
A unique factorization domain is a GCD domain. Among the GCD domains, the unique factorization domains are precisely those that are also atomic domains (which means that at least one factorization into irreducible elements exists for any nonzero nonunit).
A Bézout domain (i.e., an integral domain where every finitely generated ideal is principal) is a GCD domain. Unlike principal ideal domains (where every ideal is principal), a Bézout domain need not be a unique factorization domain; for instance the ring of entire functions is a non-atomic Bézout domain, and there are many other examples. An integral domain is a Prüfer GCD domain if and only if it is a Bézout domain.
If R is a non-atomic GCD domain, then R[X] is an example of a GCD domain that is neither a unique factorization domain (since it is non-atomic) nor a Bézout domain (since X and a non-invertible and non-zero element a of R generate an ideal not containing 1, but 1 is nevertheless a GCD of X and a); more generally any ring R[X1,...,Xn] has these properties.
 The ring  is not a GCD domain for all square-free integers .

References 

Commutative algebra
Ring theory